Antonio Guiteras y Holmes (22 November 1906 – 8 May 1935) was a leading politician in Cuba during the 1930s.

Biography
He was born 22 November 1906 in Bala Cynwyd, Pennsylvania, USA. He was a proponent of revolutionary socialism and participated in the radical government installed after the overthrow of the autocratic right wing Cuban President Gerardo Machado y Morales in 1933. In 1931, Guiteras established the Unión Revolucionaria.

Guiteras' political beliefs were nurtured in the volatile political climate of the 1920s. He first became widely known as a student leader and associate of Julio Antonio Mella, a young Communist revolutionary. He believed that the liberation of the people would be achieved through violent confrontation with the established authorities; he did not hold firm to the ideal of democracy. Antonio Guiteras was named Minister of the Interior under President Dr. Ramón Grau San Martín. Many reforms were introduced, including a minimum wage, minimum labour regulations, academic freedom, and nationalisation of important sectors of the economy. After the "government of 100 days", Guiteras became even more radical and founded Joven Cuba, a proletarian political organisation inspired by anti-capitalism and the nationalism of José Martí.

In his account Cuba: A New History, the leftist historian Richard Gott summarizes Guiteras' beliefs and methods:

He died in Matanzas, Cuba: Guiteras and several of his conspirators died in a gun battle with Batista’s army on May 8, 1935, at the abandoned Spanish Fort Morrill in the Valley of Matanzas. Guiteras was waiting there for a boat that was to take him and his companions across to México, where he hoped to continue his work for the people of Cuba.

See also

References
 Gott, Richard. Cuba: A New History. Yale University Press, 2004. .
 Rosales García, Juana. "Revolution and Anti-imperialism in Antonio Guiteras". Originally published in Cuba Socialista. Translated from the Spanish by Ana Portela.

External links
 

1906 births
1935 deaths
Politicians from Philadelphia
Cuban socialists
Cuban rebels
Assassinated Cuban politicians
People murdered in Cuba
Government ministers of Cuba
People from Bala Cynwyd, Pennsylvania
Cuban expatriates in the United States